Marco Tiago Faustino (born 23 March 1984), known as Tiago, is a former Brazilian professional footballer who played as a left back.

Football career
Born in Belo Horizonte, Minas Gerais, Tiago began his professional career at Grêmio Foot-Ball Porto Alegrense, but never broke into the first team. Subsequently, he represented Ipatinga Futebol Clube and amateurs Estrela do Norte Futebol Clube in his homeland, moving to Portugal in 2006.

During his first spell in the country, Tiago played in three Segunda Liga seasons, successively appearing for C.D. Feirense, G.D. Chaves, G.D. Estoril Praia and S.C. Freamunde. His best individual output came in 2009–10, when he scored four goals in 23 games for the latter club, helping it to the 12th place.

Tiago joined PFC Cherno More Varna in Bulgaria on 27 May 2010, on a free transfer. He marked his First Professional Football League debut with a goal, in a 2–1 win against PFC Pirin Blagoevgrad on 31 July; on 14 November he scored his second league goal of the campaign, opening the scoring in a 3–0 home victory over PFC Minyor Pernik.

After leaving the Eastern Europe nation, and following a very brief spell in Portugal, Tiago spent the vast majority of his career in his country's lower leagues. He made his professional debut in Brazil in 2014 at the age of 30, with Associação Desportiva Recreativa e Cultural Icasa in the Série B.

References

External links
 
 
 
 

1984 births
Living people
Footballers from Belo Horizonte
Brazilian footballers
Association football defenders
Campeonato Brasileiro Série B players
Campeonato Brasileiro Série C players
Campeonato Brasileiro Série D players
Grêmio Foot-Ball Porto Alegrense players
Ipatinga Futebol Clube players
Estrela do Norte Futebol Clube players
Esporte Clube Juventude players
Treze Futebol Clube players
Agremiação Sportiva Arapiraquense players
Associação Desportiva Recreativa e Cultural Icasa players
Comercial Futebol Clube (Ribeirão Preto) players
Liga Portugal 2 players
Segunda Divisão players
C.D. Feirense players
G.D. Chaves players
G.D. Estoril Praia players
S.C. Freamunde players
Portimonense S.C. players
First Professional Football League (Bulgaria) players
PFC Cherno More Varna players
Brazilian expatriate footballers
Expatriate footballers in Portugal
Expatriate footballers in Bulgaria
Brazilian expatriate sportspeople in Portugal
Brazilian expatriate sportspeople in Bulgaria